Rod Barton is an Australian politician. He is the co-founder of the Transport Matters Party and was a member of the Victorian Legislative Council, representing the Eastern Metropolitan Region. He was elected in November 2018 but was not re-elected at the 2022 election.

Barton established the Transport Matters Party in response to the deregulation of the taxi and hire car industry in 2017.

Before entering politics, Barton worked for 30 years in the taxi and hire-car industry. 

Barton lives in Melbourne with his wife. He has two daughters and five grandchildren.

Early life and career 
Barton was born in 1958 in Footscray, Victoria. His parents arrived in Australia in 1951 via ship. At age 15, he left school and commenced working.    

Barton began driving professionally approximately 30 years ago. Following in his family's footsteps, he started his working career by driving cabs, quickly moving into driving limousines as well.

In 1999, he started his own small business in the hire car industry in Victoria, Australia, which grew to have a solid client base across Melbourne over the next 20 years.  

In 2017, the Victorian Government deregulated the taxi and hire car industry and revoked taxi and hire car licences. Together with like-minded colleagues, Barton reformed the Victorian Hire Car Association (VHCA) to become the Commercial Passenger Vehicle Association of Australia (CPVAA) now known as Transport Australia Alliance (TAA) in response to Professor Fels Industry Inquiry.

In 2018, with the loss of his business's viability and his family's property, Barton and his colleague, Andre Baruch, began the steps to form a political party to address the issues caused by the deregulation of the industry.

Political Career (2018–present) 
In 2018, Barton was elected to the Legislative Council as the leading candidate for Transport Matters Party for the Eastern Metropolitan Region. Barton gave his maiden speech on 5 February 2019.

In September 2020 and in March 2021 Barton voted against The Public Health and Wellbeing Amendment (State of Emergency Extension and Other Matters) Bill 2020, rejecting "the time frame for the extensions to the state of emergency" and "the way the bill was drafted to deliver unfettered powers to the government without adequate checks and balances." 

In 2019, he proposed The Commercial Passenger Vehicle Industry Amendment Bill 2019 which sought to make touting illegal in Victoria. At this time, touters were becoming ‘aggressive, predatory, and intimidating’ according to an ABC report. Barton's amendments passed and touting is now illegal in Victoria with offenders able to receive a fine up to $10,000.

Barton is currently a member of the advisory panel to the Transport Minister regarding the commercial passenger vehicle industry.

Barton secured a Parliamentary Inquiry into Victoria's homelessness crisis on 7 June 2019. He joined the Legal and Social Issues Committee to inquire into, consider and report on the state of homelessness in Victoria.

Barton secured an Inquiry into Expanding Melbourne's Free Tram Zone, including the potential for dynamic pricing, free fares for seniors and students. In November 2020, he submitted a minority report to the Inquiry into Expanding Melbourne's Free Tram Zone.

On the 2nd September 2020, Barton secured an Inquiry Into The Use of School Buses in Regional and Rural Victoria in order to address transport disadvantage and examine how regional mobility opportunities can be improved.

On the 18th February 2021, Barton secured an Inquiry Into The Multi-Purpose Taxi Program (MPTP) after its extension to Uber. The inquiry will examine safety standards of the MPTP. 

According to The Age, between November 2018 and November 2021, Barton voted with the Andrews Government's position 63.3% of the time, the third-most of any Legislative Council crossbencher, behind only Fiona Patten (74.3%) and Andy Meddick (83.2%).

External links 

 Rod Barton MLC – Homepage 
 Transport Matters Party

References

Living people
Transport Matters Party members of the Parliament of Victoria
Members of the Victorian Legislative Council
21st-century Australian politicians
1958 births
Politicians from Melbourne
20th-century Australian businesspeople
Businesspeople from Melbourne